The School of Professional Studies is one of the schools comprising Columbia University. It offers eighteen master's degrees, courses for advancement and graduate school preparation, certificate programs, summer courses, auditing and lifelong learning programs, high school programs in New York City and abroad, and a program for learning English as a second language.

History
The predecessor of the School of Professional Studies was first established as the Division of Special Programs in 1995, and was later renamed the "Division of Continuing Education and Special Programs" in 1997. 

In 2000, the Division began to consider offering degree programs, and was reorganized as the School of Continuing Education in 2002 under its founding dean, Frank Wolf. In 2002, the university's board of trustees granted final approval for the creation of the School of Continuing Education, the first new school at Columbia in 50 years. With this new status, the School became both a Faculty and a Department of Instruction in the Arts and Sciences, and was granted authority to offer the Master of Science degree. In the course of 2002–2006 it expanded its graduate offerings to eight M.S. Programs. A cross‑enrollment agreement with Union Theological Seminary was also established in 2002. 

In 2011 the university commissioned McKinsey & Company to provide suggestions on how to improve the university. Some of the report's suggestions caused contentions with some faculty and administrators. One of the proposed changes included increasing enrollment at the School of Continuing Education to increase university funding.

In 2015, the School's incoming Dean, Jason Wingard announced that the School of Continuing Education was renamed the School of Professional Studies.

During the most recent academic year, 2019-2020, the school's 1,359 graduates represented 14.3 percent of the 9,194 master's degrees conferred across all of Columbia University's graduate and professional schools.

Academic programs
, the school offers graduate degrees in actuarial science, applied analytics, bioethics, construction administration, enterprise risk management, human capital management, nonprofit management, information and knowledge strategy, insurance management, narrative medicine, negotiation and conflict resolution, sport management, strategic communication, sustainability management, sustainability science, technology management, and wealth management.

Student Outcomes

The latest student outcomes released by Columbia's School of Professional Studies (SPS) in 2019 showed that 72% of students surveyed reported they were employed or continuing their education at the time they graduated (based on a sample of 82% of the total class).

A sample of 2016 School of Professional Studies students showed a breakdown of income as follows:

 Under $29,999: 17%
 $30,000–$49,000: 10%
 $50,000–$69,999: 25%
 $70,000–$89,999: 13%
 $90,000 or more: 35%

Rankings 

In 2020, the School's Negotiation and Conflict Resolution master's program was named the #1 Best Master's in Negotiation and Conflict Management degrees in the United States by College Choice.

In 2021, the School's Construction Administration master's program was ranked #1 and topped the list of 25 Best Master's in Construction Management, compiled by Great Business Schools. College Choice also ranked it #1 amongst the Best Master's Program in Construction Management.

In 2021, the School's Sustainability Management master's program was named #2 in the United States on Great Business Schools' list of the best Environmental & Sustainability Management Master's Programs.

Controversy 
Some controversy has arisen following the re-branding of the school as the School of Professional Studies and its expansion. In 2017 and 2019 the Columbia Senate met to discuss whether the existence of the School of Professional Studies negatively impacted the university's reputation. The External Relations Committee at Columbia expressed concerns that SPS's “proliferation of graduate degrees without academic oversight can threaten Columbia's external brand and reputation.” An ad hoc committee was formed by students and graduates after rumors surfaced that students in the Applied Analytics program were considering a lawsuit for what they believed was an inferior program. In addition, other Columbia schools, such as the engineering school and the business school, have criticized SPS for offering programs that appear to overlap with programs already offered by their respective schools. The meeting in 2017 saw continued contentions upon the matter, where a statement unanimously endorsed by the External Relations Committee was presented to criticize the school's swell in graduate degrees without adequate academic oversight.

Notable faculty
Jeffrey Sachs – University Professor and Director of the Earth Institute, Faculty in the Bioethics Program
Rita Charon – Professor of Medicine, Founder and Executive Director of the Narrative Medicine Program
Peter T. Coleman – Professor of Psychology and Education, Lecturer in Negotiation and Conflict Resolution
Jason Wingard - Professor of Human Capital Management
Robert Klitzman - Academic Director, M.S. in Bioethics Program 
Geovanny Vicente - Associate lecturer, M.S. in Enterprise Risk Management Program

Notable alumni

Andrew Hawkins – Retired NFL Player, M.S. 2017
Kira Peikoff – Journalist and Author, M.S. 2015

References

External links
 

1995 establishments in New York City
Columbia University
Educational institutions established in 1995